The 15th World Scout Jamboree was held in 1983 and was hosted by Canada at Kananaskis, Alberta, an area of Provincial Park 4,000 feet in the foothills of the Rocky Mountains, 80 miles west of Calgary, Alberta. The Spirit Lives On was the theme of the jamboree, with a total attendance of over 15,000 Scouts from over 100 countries.

The name of the Jamboree refers to the idea that Scouting, and its spirit of international brotherhood, could overcome difficulties such as those which caused the cancellation of the 1979 Jamboree four years earlier.

The subcamps were named after Canadian animals.

A camp newspaper, "The Kanaskis Journal" was produced.

Open fires were prohibited.

See also
World Scout Jamboree
Scouting in Alberta

References

External links
Jamboree Histories at Scout.org 
Jamboree Histories at Scoutbase.org
Scout Wiki : 1983 - 15th World Jamboree, Kananaskis Country, Alberta, Canada

1983

1983 in Alberta